Holy Trinity Church (1941) is an Anglican church on Hamilton Road, near Little India, Singapore.

It was built by the Fuzhou and Hokkien congregations after the government took over the original St Peter's Church site at Stamford Road in 1937 to construct the Singapore National Library. The church continued to host two congregations with separate Fuzhou and Hokkien services led by two priests. The Fuzhou congregation became Singapore's first Chinese-speaking Anglican parish in 1958. The Hokkien congregation was merged with the English-speaking Good Shepherd parish from 1963 then returned to become part of the joint Fuzhou-Hokkien Holy Trinity Parish in 1984.

There are currently two timings for services on Sundays at Holy Trinity Church. English services are at 8:45 am and 11 am, Chinese Fuzhou services are at 8:45 am and Chinese Hokkien services are at 11 am.

References

Holy Trinity